The Blue Guard, also known as the Slovene Chetniks, was a Slovenian anti-communist militia, initially under the leadership of Major Karl Novak and later Ivan Prezelj. Their official name was the Royal Yugoslav Army in Slovenia.

The detachments under Novak's command were part of the wider "Yugoslav Army in the Homeland" (JVuO) that included units from all over Yugoslavia that swore allegiance to Chetnik leader Draža Mihailović. The ranks were drawn from Slovene officers in the pre-war Royal Yugoslav Army (JV). At first, the JV units in Slovenia that offered resistance were under the command of Jaka Avšič until his mid-1941 transfer to the Yugoslav Partisans. Based on direct appointment of Draža Mihailović, the commander of Slovenian Chetniks was Karel Novak. Slovenian Chetnik units included Styrian Chetnik detachment that was, according to some estimates, the only anti-Communist military unit that consistently attacked Axis occupiers throughout the war. The detachment under Melaher's command had 200 men.

In 1942, the bulk of members joined the Legion of Death.

When Karel Novak resigned in 1944, because the defeat in the Battle of Grčarice, Mihailović appointed Ivan Prezelj as commander of the Royal Yugoslav Army in Slovenia. His headquarter was with the Inner Carniola Detachment and Soča Detachments, and the Royal Yugoslav Army in Slovenia also included the Lower Carniola Detachment and the Styria Detachment, commanded by Jože Melaher.

References

Sources

Further reading
 Slobodan Kljakić i Marijan F. Kranjc, Slovenački četnici, Beograd, 2006 
 Marijan F. Kranjc in Slobodan Kljakić, Plava garda – poveljnikovo zaupno poročilo, Maribor, 2006 
 Katja Zupanič, Četništvo na Štajerskem, Ljubljana, 2008. 

Slovenia in World War II
Military units and formations of the Chetniks in World War II
Serbia–Slovenia relations
Yugoslav Slovenia
1940s establishments in Slovenia
Defunct organizations based in Slovenia
Military units and formations established in 1941
Military units and formations disestablished in 1944
Anti-communist organizations